Sushma S. Patel is an Indian politician and a member of 17th Legislative Assembly, Uttar Pradesh in India. She represents the Mungra Badshahpur constituency in Jaunpur district of Uttar Pradesh. She is a member of Samajwadi Party.

Political career
Sushma Patel contested Uttar Pradesh Assembly Election as Bahujan Samaj Party candidate and defeated her close contestant Seema Dwivedi from Bharatiya Janata Party with a margin of 5,920 votes.

Posts held

See also
Uttar Pradesh Legislative Assembly

References

Year of birth missing (living people)
Living people
Bharatiya Janata Party politicians from Uttar Pradesh
Uttar Pradesh MLAs 2017–2022
Samajwadi Party politicians from Uttar Pradesh
Bahujan Samaj Party politicians from Uttar Pradesh